Mustard Service is an indie rock band based in Miami, Florida, formed in 2015. Self-described as "zest pop", the band's music draws influences from rock, surf, jazz, funk, and bossa nova.

Members
The band consists of Marco Rivero Ochoa on lead vocals and rhythm guitar, Gabriel Marinuchi (or "Nuchi") on lead guitar, Augusto "Tuto" Di Catarina on bass, Leo Cattani on keyboard, and Adam Perez on drums, who replaced former drummer and producer Armando Baeza after the band's first album.

History

2015–17: Formation and Zest Pop
The band formed after lead singer Marco Rivero was kicked out of a previous band he was in with bassist Augusto Di Catarina and ex-drummer Armando Baeza. A month later, Rivero wrote the song "Taking Up Space" and shared it with Baeza; the two of them then gathered the rest of the band's members and started recording their first album. The name Mustard Service was taken from a band name generator. According to Rivero, "I did it like three times, it was between Mustard Service, Milk Inequality, and like… Johnny’s Trashcan."

Their debut album, Zest Pop, was released on June 17, 2017.

2018–20: "Need", "Daddy Dookie Brown", and C'est La Vie
In fall 2018, Mustard Service accompanied the Madrid band Hinds on a sixteen-date U.S. tour, where they received praise for their energetic stage performances.

Mustard Service released the single "Daddy Dookie Brown" and an accompanying music video on July 26, 2019. A second single, "Need", was released in November 2019.

Their sophomore album, C'est La Vie, was released on March 23, 2020, and marked a change in style from their previous album both musically and thematically. Rivero remarked that since Zest Pop, the band had "learned a lot more musically. So this one is a little bit more sophisticated." Rivero also noted that the lyrical themes of C'est La Vie were more light-hearted and less personal: "when we wrote Zest Pop, I didn’t think that anyone would hear it, so I wrote whatever I wanted, kind of like a journal... and then I realized people started listening, so I said, I don’t want to write anything personal anymore. I wanted to write about a kid who liked to get peed on [in reference to "Daddy Dookie Brown"], so..." The writing process of C'est La Vie also differed from Zest Pop in that C'est La Vie was written by the whole band using a more collaborative approach, while Zest Pop had been written mostly by Rivero and Baeza.

2021–present: Fiddle Lake
On October 27, 2021, Mustard Service released their first EP, Fiddle Lake. With songs reflecting on politics, addiction, and work culture, Fiddle Lake takes on more mature themes than Mustard Service's previous albums.

Style and influences
The band's music contains elements drawn from a variety of genres, including jazz, funk, surf, and R&B, but is most often described as indie rock or indie pop; the band calls their own genre "zest pop". Reviewers often describe their music as "beachy", and the band cites the Beach Boys as their main influence. Rivero also lists the Red Hot Chili Peppers, Mac DeMarco, and Mild High Club as some of his inspirations.

Mustard Service's members all have Latin heritage and speak some amount of Spanish, and the band frequently uses elements from Latin music, in particular, bossa nova, in their songs. The song "Pleasantries (With Your Lover)", for example, uses a Latin-style groove. The band also performs songs with lyrics in Spanish, such as "Hijo de Papá", which appears on C'est La Vie.

Discography

Albums
 Zest Pop (2017)
 C'est La Vie (2020)

Extended plays
 Fiddle Lake (2021)

Singles
 "Dead Skin" (2019, with RealLiveAnimals)
 "Daddy Dookie Brown" (2019)
 "Need" (2019)
 "Baby It's Scary" (2020)
 "Drink With A Friend" (2022)
 “The Dominoes” (2022)

References

External links
 Official website

Indie rock musical groups from Florida
Musical groups from Miami
Musical groups established in 2015
2015 establishments in Florida
Musical quintets
Surf music groups